Lockney is an unincorporated community in Gilmer County, West Virginia, United States. Lockney had a post office, which opened on May 17, 1898, and closed on November 9, 2002. The community was named after H. C. Lockney, a senator who was instrumental in securing for the town a post office.

References

Unincorporated communities in Gilmer County, West Virginia
Unincorporated communities in West Virginia